Julia Smith Gibbons (born December 23, 1950 in Pulaski, Tennessee) is a United States circuit judge of the United States Court of Appeals for the Sixth Circuit.

Education and Career 

Gibbons was born and grew up in Pulaski, Tennessee. She attended public schools and was the valedictorian at Giles County High School, class of 1968. She received a Bachelor of Arts, magna cum laude, from Vanderbilt University in 1972 and was elected to Phi Beta Kappa. She received a Juris Doctor from the University of Virginia School of Law in 1975, where she was elected to Order of the Coif and was a member of the Editorial Board of the Virginia Law Review.

After graduation, from 1975 to 1976, she served as a law clerk to the late Honorable William Ernest Miller, Circuit Judge of the United States Court of Appeals for the Sixth Circuit. She was admitted to the Tennessee bar in 1975. She was in private practice from 1976 to 1979 with the Memphis firm of Farris, Hancock, Gilman, Branan & Lanier. In 1979, she joined Tennessee Governor Lamar Alexander's staff as a legal advisor.

Judicial Service

State Court Service 
In 1981, Tennessee Governor Lamar Alexander appointed Gibbons to serve as a judge of the Tennessee Circuit Court for the Fifteenth Judicial Circuit, which has jurisdiction over Macon, Jackson, Smith, Trousdale, and Wilson Counties.  She was elected to a full term in 1982. She is the first woman trial judge of a court of record in Tennessee.

District Court Service 

Gibbons was nominated by President Ronald Reagan on April 12, 1983, to a seat on the United States District Court for the Western District of Tennessee vacated by Judge Harry W. Wellford. She was confirmed by the United States Senate on June 6, 1983, and received commission on June 7, 1983. She served as Chief Judge from 1994 to 2000. Her service terminated on August 2, 2002, due to elevation to the Sixth Circuit.

Court of Appeals Service 

Gibbons was nominated by President George W. Bush on October 9, 2001, to a seat on the United States Court of Appeals for the Sixth Circuit vacated by Judge Gilbert S. Merritt Jr. She was confirmed by the Senate on July 29, 2002 by a 95–0 vote. Gibbons was the first judge nominated to the Sixth Circuit by Bush and confirmed by the Senate. She received her commission on July 31, 2002.

Honors and Distinctions 
In 2021, Gibbons received the Devitt Award, the highest honor awarded to an Article III judge, for distinguished career and significant contributions to the administration of justice, the advancement of the rule of law, and the improvement of society as a whole. In 2017, she received the Pillars of Excellence Award from the University of Memphis Law Alumni Association. In 2015, she received the King's Award from Carnival Memphis. In 2000, she was selected by the Memphis Bar Association to receive the Heroine for Women in the Law Award. In 1992, she was selected by the Association for Women Attorneys to receive the Marion Griffin-Frances Loring Award. In 1992, she was selected by Girls, Inc. to receive the "She Knows Where She's Going" award. In 1985 and 2001, she was selected by Memphis attorneys to receive Outstanding Judge of the Year Award.

Gibbons was appointed by Chief Justice William H. Rehnquist to chair the Budget Committee of the Judicial Conference of the United States in January 2005. She served in that position until January 2018 and testified before Congress on behalf of the judiciary 16 times. From 2000 to 2003, Gibbons was a member of the Judicial Panel on Multidistrict Litigation. From 1994 to 1999, Gibbons was chair of the Judicial Resources Committee of the Judicial Conference.

Notable Cases 

Gibbons wrote a concurring opinion in a 2-1 decision upholding Biden Administration COVID-19 vaccine mandate for federal employees and contractors. In her concurrence, Gibbons highlighted the limited role of the federal judiciary in COVID policy.

Personal 

Gibbons has been married since 1973 to Bill Gibbons, who is the former District Attorney General of Shelby County, Tennessee, the county that contains Memphis. Bill Gibbons was a 2010 Republican gubernatorial candidate for the state of Tennessee. They have two adult children.

In 2003, she discussed her views on women in the judiciary at a University of Virginia School of Law event.

References

External links 

1950 births
20th-century American judges
21st-century American judges
American women lawyers
Living people
Judges of the United States Court of Appeals for the Sixth Circuit
Judges of the United States District Court for the Western District of Tennessee
People from Pulaski, Tennessee
United States court of appeals judges appointed by George W. Bush
United States district court judges appointed by Ronald Reagan
University of Virginia School of Law alumni
Vanderbilt University alumni
20th-century American women judges
21st-century American women judges